Anders Håkan Lans (born 2 November 1947 in Enskede) is a Swedish inventor. He holds two patents:
 a memory controller for a framebuffer: "Data processing system and apparatus for color graphics display". Framebuffer with memory controllers had been in common use for years at the time of this 1979 patent filing.
 a calligraphic display "Arrangement for producing a pattern on a light-sensitive surface"

STDMA 
Håkan Lans is the designer of a tracking system which makes use of a Self-Organized Time Division Multiple Access (STDMA) datalink. The STDMA datalink is currently in use in Automatic Identification System (AIS). AIS is a short range coastal tracking system which is mandatory aboard international voyaging ships with gross tonnage (GT) of 300 or more tons, and all passenger ships regardless of size.

STDMA is also in use as one of the three physical layer models proposed for Automatic dependent surveillance-broadcast (ADS-B), a cooperative surveillance technique for air traffic control which is in the process of implementation.

Lans has his own company, GP&C Systems International AB, which is focused on marketing STDMA.

Legal disputes 
Concerning the patent on the framebuffer controller, in 1997 Lans as an individual sued several companies, including Compaq, Gateway and Hewlett Packard, for not paying royalties, and allegedly infringing on his patent. The defendants counterclaimed that the patent was assigned to Uniboard AB, a company wholly owned by Lans. The judge ruled that this was the case and thus Lans lost the case. This has led to a dispute between Lans and his attorneys, who Lans has sued for misconduct. This suit was settled in April 2012. An allegation was presented on Swedish National Television that an attorney's conduct was due to alleged connections with The Pentagon, in order to stop Lans' progress on his STDMA patent.

Another debate is regarding STDMA. There was a patent application for the system, but a US patent ex-parte reexamination certificate was issued in 2010 canceling all claims.

See also 
 Automatic Identification System (AIS)
 ADS-B#VDL mode 4

References

External links 
 
 GP&C Systems International AB
 The story as told from Lans side

1947 births
Living people
20th-century Swedish inventors